Sansovino may refer to:

People
Andrea Sansovino ( – 1529), artist
Francesco Sansovino (1521–1586), scholar, son of Jacopo
Jacopo Sansovino (1486–1570), sculptor and architect, father of Francesco

Other uses
A.C. Sansovino, a football club
, a LSI (L) in service during 1945
Sansovino (horse), winner of the 1924 Epsom Derby